Unix may refer to:

Unix, a family of operating systems, the first originally developed by Bell Labs at AT&T
 Single UNIX Specification, the trademark UNIX and the terms of its use, now owned by The Open Group
 POSIX (IEEE 1003 or ISO/IEC 9945), the basic Unix interface standard
 OpenServer (formerly SCO Unix, System V) the owner's version of the operating system, now owned by Xinuos
 UNIX System V, the orthodox family of licensed Unices, canonical form being SCO Unix that became Open Server
 BSD Unix, the widespread family of licensed Unices originating from UCBerkeley
 BSD licenses, a family of software licenses, sometimes called "Unix license"
 Unix System Laboratories, the division that developed unix, especially the System V family
 SCOsource, the owner of unix intellectual property, especially as it relates to the canonical form SCO Unix
 List of Unix systems, for a Unix operating system
Unix-like, the extended family of operating systems inspired by and having a general similarity with Unix
Unix Magazine, a defunct magazine covering unix and unix-like software sector
UNIX Review, a defunct magazine covering unix software sector

See also
 
 
 History of Unix
 Unix wars, the battle between BSD Unix and System V for supremacy
 UnixWorld, a defunct magazine covering unix software sector
 UNICE (disambiguation)
 Eunice (disambiguation)
 Eunuch (disambiguation)